Elections to the Baseball Hall of Fame for 1981 followed the system in place since 1978. 
The Baseball Writers' Association of America (BBWAA) voted by mail to select from recent major league players and elected Bob Gibson. The Veterans Committee met in closed sessions to consider older major league players as well as managers, umpires, executives, and figures from the Negro leagues. It selected Rube Foster and Johnny Mize. Foster would be one of two people from the Negro leagues elected in seventeen years, before introduction of a separate ballot in 1995. A formal induction ceremony was held in Cooperstown, New York, on August 2, 1981, with Commissioner of Baseball Bowie Kuhn presiding.

BBWAA election
The BBWAA was authorized to elect players active in 1961 or later, but not after 1975; the ballot included candidates from the 1980 ballot who received at least 5% of the vote but were not elected, along with selected players, chosen by a screening committee, whose last appearance was in 1975. All 10-year members of the BBWAA were eligible to vote.

Voters were instructed to cast votes for up to 10 candidates; any candidate receiving votes on at least 75% of the ballots would be honored with induction to the Hall. The ballot consisted of 39 players; a total of 401 ballots were cast, with 301 votes required for election. A total of 3,026 individual votes were cast, an average of 7.55 per ballot. Those candidates receiving less than 5% of the vote will not appear on future BBWAA ballots, but may eventually be considered by the Veterans Committee.

Candidates who were eligible for the first time are indicated here with a dagger (†). The one candidate who received at least 75% of the vote and were elected is indicated in bold italics; candidates who have since been elected in subsequent elections are indicated in italics. The 17 candidates who received less than 5% of the vote, thus becoming ineligible for future BBWAA consideration, are indicated with an asterisk (*).

Ted Kluszewski was on the ballot for the 15th and final time.

The newly-eligible players included 18 All-Stars, three of whom were not included on the ballot, representing a total of 71 All-Star selections. Among the new candidates were 11-time All-Star Harmon Killebrew, 9-time All-Star Juan Marichal, 8-time All-Star Bob Gibson, 7-time All-Star Thurman Munson and 5-time All-Star Leo Cárdenas. The field included three MVPs (Gibson, Killebrew and Munson), two Cy Young Award winners (Bob Gibson, who won twice while receiving MVP in one of those years, and Jim Perry) and one Rookie of the Year (Munson).

Players eligible for the first time who were not included on the ballot were: Ed Brinkman, Danny Cater, Tom Egan, Bob Locker, Tommy McCraw, Jim Merritt, Gene Michael, Orlando Peña, Paul Popovich, Eddie Watt, Walt Williams and Clyde Wright.

J. G. Taylor Spink Award 
Joe Reichler (1915–1988) and Milton Richman (1922–1986) received the J. G. Taylor Spink Award honoring baseball writers. The awards were voted at the December 1980 meeting of the BBWAA, and included in the summer 1981 ceremonies.

References

External links
1981 Election at www.baseballhalloffame.org

Baseball Hall of Fame balloting
Hall of Fame balloting